Polygonum species (knotweeds) are used as food plants by the larvae of some Lepidoptera species including:

Monophagous
Species which feed exclusively on Polygonum

 Coleophoridae
 Several Coleophora case-bearer species:
 C. borea
 C. shaleriella

Polyphagous
Species which feed on Polygonum and other plants

 Gelechiidae
 Chionodes discoocellella
 Geometridae
 Idaea aversata (riband wave)
 Idaea biselata (small fan-footed wave)
 Orthonama obstipata (gem) – leaves
 Timandra comae (blood-vein)
 Noctuidae
 Agrotis clavis (heart and club)
 Agrotis exclamationis (heart and dart)
 Axylia putris (flame)
 Euxoa nigricans (garden dart)
 Melanchra persicariae (dot moth)
 Orthosia gothica (Hebrew character)

External links

Polygonum
+Lepidoptera